Vyacheslav Plaksunov (born 6 March 1968) is a Belarusian cross-country skier. He competed at the 1994 Winter Olympics and the 1998 Winter Olympics.

Cross-country skiing results
All results are sourced from the International Ski Federation (FIS).

Olympic Games

World Championships

World Cup

Season standings

Team podiums
 1 podium

References

External links
 

1968 births
Living people
Belarusian male cross-country skiers
Olympic cross-country skiers of Belarus
Cross-country skiers at the 1994 Winter Olympics
Cross-country skiers at the 1998 Winter Olympics
Sportspeople from Vitebsk Region